Navidad is the fifth album released by the flamenco-influenced Latin guitar instrumental duo Lara & Reyes.

Track listing
"Winter Wonderland"  – 3:03
"Santa Claus is Coming to Town"  – 2:15
"Have Yourself a Merry Little Christmas"  – 2:40
"Away in a Manger"  – 1:32
"White Christmas:  – 2:19
"God Rest ye Merry Gentlemen"  – 3:06
"Silent Night"  – 2:21
"The Christmas Song"  – 2:59
"Feliz Navidad"  – 2:59
"Frosty the Snowman"  – 2:09
"Silver Bells"  – 2:18
"What Child Is This?"  – 1:44
"O Come All Ye Faithful"  – 2:05
"Angels We Have Heard on High"  – 3:42
"Rudolph the Red-Nosed Reindeer"  – 2:38
"Let it Snow! Let it Snow! Let it Snow!"  – 1:55
"We Wish You a Merry Christmas"  – 1:49
"Auld Lang Syne"  – 1:59

References

2000 Christmas albums
Lara & Reyes albums
Higher Octave albums
Christmas albums by American artists